The Pre-Mediterranean Cup was an association football friendly tournament competition hosted by the Hellenic Football Federation in Athens. 

In June 1991, the one and only Pre-Mediterranean cup were conducted in Georgios Kamaras Stadium, the home field of Apollon Smyrna, with the participation of the best-eight football clubs in Greece. Olympiacos, Panathinaikos, PAOK and Iraklis forfeited the competition due to their players being tired from constant Superleague (known as A Ethniki at the time) games. In the semi-finals, AEK Athens played against Apollon Smyrna and won 4-2, and OFI Crete played against Athinaikos and won 1-0. In the final game of the competition, AEK Athens secured a 1-0 victory against OFI Crete to obtain the title, the only goal of the game was scored by Takis Karagiozopoulos from the penalty spot.

Fixtures

Quarter-finals

Semi-finals

Final

References

Bibliography 
 Συλλογικό έργο (2014). 90 ΧΡΟΝΙΑ, Η ΙΣΤΟΡΙΑ ΤΗΣ ΑΕΚ . Αθήνα, Ελλάδα: Εκδοτικός Οίκος Α. Α. Λιβάνη. .
 Παναγιωτακόπουλος, Παναγιώτης (2021). 1963-2021 ΤΟ ΤΑΞΙΔΙ ΣΥΝΕΧΙΖΕΤΑΙ . Αθήνα, Ελλάδα: .
 Παναγιωτακόπουλος, Παναγιώτης (2022). 1979-2003 ΤΟ ΤΑΞΙΔΙ ΣΥΝΕΧΙΖΕΤΑΙ...Νο2 . Αθήνα, Ελλάδα: .

 
Mediterranean Games
Mediterranean Games
Multi-sport events in Greece
Mediterranean Games
20th century in Athens
June 1991 sports events in Europe
Football competitions in Greece